Glodeanu may refer to one of two communes in Buzău County, Romania:

Glodeanu Sărat
Glodeanu-Siliștea